Quitilipi is a central department of Chaco Province in Argentina.

The provincial subdivision has a population of about 32,000 inhabitants in an area of  1.545 km², and its capital city is Quitilipi, which is located some 1.160 km from the City of Buenos Aires.

References

External links

Website containing information about Quitilipi (Spanish)

Departments of Chaco Province